Klöden Island is a minor island in the Bastian Islands in the Svalbard archipelago. It lies east of Wilhelm Island and northeast of Spitsbergen.

There are unnamed holms off the northwest shore of the island. The wildlife consists largely of polar bears.

The Bastian Islands were discovered in 1867 by the Swedish-Norwegian polar explorer Nils Fredrik Rønnbeck, who was the first to sail around Spitsbergen. Most of the Bastian Islands were named during the First German North Polar Expedition in 1868, led by Carl Koldewey, and this island was named after the German geographer Gustav Adolf von Klöden (1814–1885).

References

Islands of Svalbard